Demir and Baykara v Turkey [2008] ECHR 1345 is a landmark European Court of Human Rights case concerning Article 11 ECHR and the right to engage in collective bargaining. It affirmed the fundamental right of workers to engage in collective bargaining and take collective action to achieve that end.

Facts
Mr Vemal Demir was a member, and Mrs Vicdan Baykara was the president, of the Turkish trade union for civil servants, Tüm Bel Sen. The union signed a two-year collective agreement in 1993, but the employer, the Gaziantep Municipal Council did not comply with its provisions. Demir and Baykara brought proceedings in the District Court, and won their claim. However, on appeal the Court of Cassation quashed the decision. This Court held there was a right to join a union, but the union itself had "no authority to enter into collective agreements as the law stood".

The matter was then remitted to the District Court, which in defiance restated its view that Demir and Baykara did have a right to collective agreements, because this accorded with International Labour Organization Conventions ratified by Turkey. But again, the Court of Cassation overturned the District Court's decision. Furthermore, a separate claim in the Audit Court had been brought, which found that civil servants had no authority to engage in the collective agreement, and so the civil servants had to get the union to repay extra benefits it had got under the "defunct" collective agreement.

After these domestic avenues were exhausted, in 1996 the union made an application to the European Court of Human Rights, alleging breach of freedom of association under article 11 ECHR and protection against discrimination under article 14 ECHR. After some time, in 2006, the case was heard by seven judges of the second section. It was held that article 11 had been violated, and there was no need to examine article 14. The Turkish Government then requested that the matter be referred to the Grand Chamber.

Judgment
The Grand Chamber of the European Court of Human Rights held unanimously that there had been a disproportionate and unjustified interference with the right to freedom of association.

The Grand Chamber then turned to whether the Court of Cassation's annulment of the collective agreement between the trade union Tüm Bel Sen and the authority which had been applied for the previous two years was lawful, based on its interference with article 11 ECHR.

Significance
Demir and Baykara v Turkey has widely been seen as a landmark case in the international development of freedom of association. Its significance lies in confirming that there is an inherent right to collective bargaining protected by article 11 ECHR, within the right to freedom of association. Only interference that is strictly necessary in a democratic society can be justified.

A particular point of interest is its apparent tension with decisions of the European Court of Justice of the European Union in The Rosella and Laval, which held that there is a qualified right to strike, but one which can only be exercised when it does not disproportionately affect the EU business right to freedom of establishment or providing services. It is highly open to question that these two cases, which preceded the judgment in Demir could be reconciled, given that Convention jurisprudence places the emphasis on justifying restrictions on the human right to free association, and would seem to favour greater attention to the need to collectively bargain. This had led to predictions that there could be a "showdown" between the Strasbourg and Luxembourg courts. Ewing and Hendy write,

The judgement also elaborated on the living instrument doctrine, stating:

See also
ECHR cases
Wilson v United Kingdom (2002) 35 EHRR 20, [2002] ECHR 552
Associated Society of Locomotive Engineers and Firemen v United Kingdom [2007] IRLR 361
EU cases
The Rosella [2008] IRLR 143 (C-438/05), on freedom of establishment
Laval Un Partneri Ltd v Svenska Byggnadsarbetareforbundet [2008] IRLR 160 (C-319/05, see also (C-319/06), on free movement of services

Notes

References
KD Ewing and J Hendy QC, 'The Dramatic Implications of Demir and Baykara' (2010) 39(1) Industrial Law Journal 2

External links
Eurofound.europa.eu summary of the case
[2008] ECHR 1345 Full text of judgment
 http://www.law.utoronto.ca/documents/conferences2/StrikeSymposium09_Ewing-Hendy.pdf

Labour case law
Article 11 of the European Convention on Human Rights
European Court of Human Rights cases involving Turkey
2008 in case law
Trade union case law
2008 in Turkey